The 1989 Oklahoma Sooners football team represented University of Oklahoma during the 1989 NCAA Division I-A football season. They played their home games at Oklahoma Memorial Stadium and competed as members of the Big Eight Conference. They were coached by first-year head coach Gary Gibbs. They were ineligible to participate in a bowl game since they were on probation. In addition, the Sooners were not allowed to appear on live television, although all their games were taped delayed and shown late Saturday nights on the Sooner Later Network and a few on Prime Network.

Schedule

Rankings

Personnel

Season summary

Preseason 
Quarterback Charles Thompson was arrested in February 1989 for selling cocaine to an undercover FBI agent.  Barry Switzer resigned on June 9 amid player misconduct and allegations of recruiting violations, five players had been arrested on felony charges, and the NCAA placed the Sooners on probation, with penalties that included reduced scholarships and a postseason ban for the 1989 and 1990 seasons.

New Mexico State

Baylor

at Arizona

at Kansas

Oklahoma State

vs Texas

at Iowa State

Colorado 

Oklahoma shut out in the first half for first time since 1965

Missouri

Kansas State

at Nebraska

Awards 
 All-Big Eight: LB Frank Blevins, DT Scott Evans, NG Dante Williams

Postseason

NFL draft 
The following players were drafted into the National Football League following the season.

References

External links 
 1989 Oklahoma Sooners at College Football @ Sports-Reference.com

Oklahoma
Oklahoma Sooners football seasons
Oklahoma Sooners football